Norway entered the Eurovision Song Contest 1992 with Merethe Trøan and "Visjoner" after she won the Norwegian pre-selection for the contest, Melodi Grand Prix 1992. At Eurovision, her performance received 23 points, placing her 18th of 23 competing countries.

Before Eurovision

Melodi Grand Prix 1992 
The Norwegian broadcaster Norsk Rikskringkasting (NRK) continued to use the Melodi Grand Prix format to select the Norwegian entry for Eurovision. 

The 1992 edition of Melodi Grand Prix was held on 21 March 1992 at the Oslo Spektrum in Oslo, hosted by Elisabeth Andreassen and Jahn Teigen. 10 songs competed and the winner was selected by ten regional juries. The winner was Merethe Trøan with the song "Visjoner", composed by Robert Morley and Eva Jansen.

At Eurovision
Trøan performed 21st on the night of the contest, following Yugoslavia and preceding Germany. She received 23 points in total, placing 18th in a field of 23.

The members of the Norwegian jury included Sigurd Køhn, Erik Wesseltoft, Tora Ulstrup, Vibeke Wesenlund, Solveig Ravne, Gustavo Pollastri, Mette Lie, Bernt Finseth, Julie Holm, Per Gudim Thorbjørnsen, Tine Mørch Smith, Torill Jordsjø, Jan Paul Brekke, Carl Størmer, Reidar Skår, and Staffan William Olsson.

Voting

References

External links
Norwegian National Final 1992
Full national final on nrk.no

1992
Countries in the Eurovision Song Contest 1992
1992
Eurovision
Eurovision